Grevillea triloba is a spreading shrub endemic to Western Australia, principally the Geraldton area.

Description
The flowers, which are sweet-scented, are usually white but pink flowering forms have been observed within the natural distribution. These are produced from early winter to mid spring (June to October In Australia). Its narrow leaves are three-lobed (hence the specific name triloba) and each of the lobes terminates in a sharp point.

Taxonomy
The plant was first formally described by the botanist Carl Meissner in 1855 in New Proteaceae of Australia as a part of the as a part of the William Jackson Hooker work Hooker's Journal of Botany and Kew Garden Miscellany.

Distribution
The shrub is native to coastal areas in the Mid West region of Western Australia mostly to the north of Geraldton with the bulk of the population found between Northampton and Geraldton. It is mostly found on sandplains growing in sandy loam soils over or around limeston or sandstone or in lateritic soils.

See also
 List of Grevillea species

References

triloba
Endemic flora of Western Australia
Eudicots of Western Australia
Proteales of Australia
Taxa named by Carl Meissner
Plants described in 1855